Eric Kenneth Gillott (born 15 April 1951) played first-class and List A cricket for Northern Districts between 1971/72 and 1978/79. He also toured England in 1973 as part of the New Zealand team that played three Tests, though he did not feature in the Tests. He was born at Waiuku, Auckland, New Zealand.

Gillott was a right-handed tail-end batsman and a slow left-arm orthodox spin bowler. He made his first-class and List A debuts for Northern Districts in the 1971/72 season and in his second match he took six Otago wickets for 79 runs in 43 overs in the match at Dunedin. The 29 wickets he took in six matches in that New Zealand cricket season were beaten only by the 31 taken by another slow left-arm bowler, the Test player Hedley Howarth. He followed this with 23 wickets in the 1972/73 season, with a further six-wicket haul, six for 105, in the match against Wellington at the Basin Reserve.

This led to his call-up for the 1973 New Zealand tour of England, but he was not a success and took only 10 first-class wickets on the tour. Wisden Cricketers' Almanack's report of the tour said of him: "Gillott showed he had yet to develop all the skills of a top-class left-hander." It noted also that there were few pitches suited to spin bowling, which also had not helped the senior left-arm spinner, Howarth, who had been successful on the 1969 tour. Gillott was no more successful on his return to New Zealand for the 1973/74 season, and he dropped out of the Northern Districts side at the end of the season.

In 1976, Gillott spent a cricket season in England playing non-first-class Minor Counties cricket for  Buckinghamshire, taking 41 wickets in the season, the most by any player in the team. He returned to New Zealand for a further single season of first-class cricket for Northern Districts in 1978/79, but with little success, and left top-class cricket entirely after that.

References

1951 births
Living people
New Zealand cricketers
Northern Districts cricketers
Buckinghamshire cricketers